Henry Allison (born 14 July 1828 in Campbell Town, Tasmania), was an Australian cricket player, who played two first-class cricket matches for Tasmania.

He died on 12 May 1881 in Coupeville, Washington, United States at the age of 52.

See also
 List of Tasmanian representative cricketers

External links
Cricinfo Profile

1828 births
1881 deaths
Australian cricketers
Tasmania cricketers
Australian emigrants to the United States